HD 7853 is a double star in the constellation Andromeda. With an apparent magnitude of 6.46, it can barely be seen with the naked eye even on the best of nights. The system is located approximately  distant, and the brighter star is an Am star, meaning that it has unusual metallic absorption lines.  The spectral classification of kA5hF1mF2 means that it would have a spectral class of A5 if it were based solely on the calcium K line, F2 if based on the lines of other metals, and F1 if based on the hydrogen absorption lines.  The two components are six arc-seconds apart and the secondary is three magnitudes fainter than the primary.

References

Andromeda (constellation)
007853
Double stars
0379
Am stars
006140
Durchmusterung objects